The discography of English singer-songwriter Ben Howard consists of four studio albums, six extended plays, sixteen singles and eleven music videos. Howard signed to Island Records in 2011, due to the label's history of UK folk singers, including Nick Drake and John Martyn. After singles "Old Pine" and "The Wolves" were released in 2011, Howard recorded his debut album titled Every Kingdom, which was released on 3 October 2011. He was nominated for the 2012 Mercury Prize.

In 2012, Howard launched his music in the United States, with Every Kingdom being released on 3 April 2012. In November 2012, Howard released The Burgh Island EP produced by Chris Bond, which featured four new tracks. Once again released to critical acclaim, the EP had a darker, more menacing tone than most of Howard's previous work, with Howard also playing electric guitar, rather than his traditional acoustic. 

In 2014, his second studio album I Forget Where We Were became his first to reach number one in the UK. Howard released his third studio album Noonday Dream in June 2018 which peaked at number four in the UK and was met with critical acclaim. In January 2021, Howard released "What a Day", the first single from his fourth studio album Collections from the Whiteout that was released on 26 March 2021.

Studio albums

Extended plays

Singles

Other charted songs

Music videos

References

Howard, Ben